Hugh Macilwain Last (3 December 1894 – 25 October 1957) was Camden Professor of Ancient History at the University of Oxford and Principal of Brasenose College, Oxford.

Early life
Last was born in London on 3 December 1894; his father was William Last, director of the Science Museum. He was educated at St Paul's School, London and then Lincoln College, Oxford. Starting late at university because of health problems, he obtained a first-class degree in literae humaniores (classics) in 1918.

Academic career
Last was appointed as a Fellow of St John's College, Oxford in 1919. His interest in the history of Ancient Rome had been sparked at school by the classical historian T. Rice Holmes, who taught at St Paul's, and continued at Lincoln under William Warde Fowler. His interests also broadened into related spheres such as ancient Oriental history.  In 1927, he was appointed as a university lecturer in Roman history, and became Camden Professor of Ancient History in 1936, a post that carried with it a fellowship at Brasenose College. During the Second World War he worked at the British codebreaking centre at Bletchley Park, and in 1948 became the Principal of Brasenose, despite his health and the college's poor financial position.

He was on the governing body of Abingdon School from 1947-1950.

Later life
He retired because his health difficulties in 1956. He died, unmarried, on 25 October 1957.

References

1894 births
1957 deaths
English classical scholars
People educated at St Paul's School, London
Alumni of Lincoln College, Oxford
Fellows of St John's College, Oxford
Fellows of Brasenose College, Oxford
Principals of Brasenose College, Oxford
Historians of antiquity
Camden Professors of Ancient History
Governors of Abingdon School
Presidents of The Roman Society